Magee Marshall & Company was a brewery that operated from the Crown Brewery in Bolton, Lancashire, England. It was founded by David Magee, a brewer and spirit merchant, in 1853. He moved from the Good Samaritan Brewhouse to the Crown Hotel in the 1860s and built the Crown Brewery in Derby Street next to the hotel. After his death, he was succeeded by his sons, who acquired David Marshall's Grapes Brewery and the Horseshoe Brewery. The company was registered  as Magee Marshall & Company Ltd. in 1888. The company acquired Henry Robinson's Brewery in Wigan and Halliwell's Alexandra Brewery. In 1959, it was acquired by Greenall Whitley & Company and closed in 1970.

The brewery, built in 1893 (Brewers Journal 1893 p564) by William Bradford (architect), in the "traditional brewery style" with a five-storey section for gravity processing and an ornamental tower. Up to the 1950s the company transported water, high in dissolved calcium carbonate content, in tankers by rail from Burton on Trent for the brewing process.

References
Notes

Bibliography

Companies based in Bolton
Defunct breweries of the United Kingdom